The trishula is a trident, a divine symbol, commonly used as one of the principal symbols in Hinduism. 

In Nepal and Thailand, the term also often refers to a short-handled weapon which may be mounted on a daṇḍa "staff". Unlike the Okinawan sai, the trishula is often bladed. In Indonesian, trisula usually refers specifically to a long-handled trident, while the diminutive version is more commonly known as a cabang or tekpi.

Etymology 

The name trishula ultimately derives from the Sanskrit word त्रिशूल (triśūla), from त्रि (trí), meaning "three", and शूल (śū́la), meaning "a sharp iron pin or stake", referring in this case to the weapon's three prongs.

Symbolism

The trishula symbolism is polyvalent and rich. It is wielded by the god Shiva and is said to have been used to sever the original head of Ganesha. Durga also holds a trishula, as one of her many weapons. The three points have various meanings and significance, and, common to Hinduism, have many stories behind them. They are commonly said to represent various trinities: creation, preservation, and destruction; past, present, and future; body, mind and atman; dharma or dhamma (law and order), bliss/mutual enjoyment and emanation/created bodies; compassion, joy and love; spiritual, psychic and relative; happiness, comfort and boredom; pride, repute and egotism; clarity, knowledge and wisdom; heaven, mind and earth; soul, fire and earth; soul, passion and embodied-soul; logic, passion and faith; prayer, manifestation and sublime; insight, serenity and bodhisattvahood or arhatship (anti-conceit); practice, understanding and wisdom; death, ascension and resurrection; creation, order and destruction; the three gunas: satva, rajas and tamas.

Other uses
According to the Shiva Purana, Shiva is swayambhu, self-created, born of his volitions. He emerges as a direct incarnation of Sadashiv and has a trishula from the very beginning. According to the Vishnu Purana, Surya married Sanjana, the daughter of Vishvakarma. However, Sanjana soon became unhappy with her married life, owing to the unbearable heat emanating from Surya. She complained to Vishvakarma, who agreed to solve the problem and came to an arrangement with Surya to reduce his heat. The solar matter fell to the earth, reducing 1/8th of his original power. This material was later used by Vishvakarma to create the Trishula for Shiva, Sudarshana Chakra for Vishnu, and the Pushpaka Vimana for Brahma. The goddess Durga holds a trishula among other weapons and attributes in her hands and amongst her accouterment, having received celestial weapons from both Shiva and Vishnu.

A similar word, trishel, is the Romani word for 'cross'.

Gallery

See also

Kaumodaki
Pitchfork
Sai (weapon)
Tekpi
Thyrsus
Trident
Tryzub
Columns of Gediminas

References

External links

Weapons in Hindu mythology
Weapons in Buddhist mythology
Hindu symbols
Heraldic charges
Indian melee weapons
Weapons of India
Buddhist ritual implements
Spears
Indian iconography
Tridents